Reginald John "R. J." Hollingdale (20 October 1930 – 28 September 2001) was a British biographer and translator of German philosophy and literature, especially the works of Friedrich Nietzsche, Goethe, E. T. A. Hoffmann, G. C. Lichtenberg, and Schopenhauer.

Life and career
"Reg" Hollingdale dropped out of Bec Grammar School, Tooting at the age of 16 in order become a journalist, working in a junior position for a Croydon newspaper. He was called up to the Royal Air Force at a young age in the late 1940s, as part of his National Service, for two years before returning to journalism.  After paying his way through private German lessons, and immersing himself in German literature and philosophy, Hollingdale earned the respect of readers and academics with his translations and studies of German cultural figures. Despite not possessing a degree, Hollingdale was elected president of a scholarly society, and was a visiting scholar at the University of Melbourne in 1991–1992. He also worked as a sub-editor at The Guardian and as a critic for The Times Literary Supplement.

Hollingdale was elected President of The Friedrich Nietzsche Society in 1989. Along with Walter Kaufmann, he was responsible for rehabilitating Nietzsche's reputation in the English-speaking world after the Second World War. Hollingdale was an atheist.

Partial bibliography

Original works 
Nietzsche: The Man and his Philosophy (1965; 2nd rvd. edn., 2001)
Thomas Mann: A Critical Study (1973)
A Nietzsche Reader (1978)
Western Philosophy: An Introduction (1994)

Translations 
Essays and Aphorisms, selections from Parerga and Paralipomena, by Arthur Schopenhauer (1973)
Elective Affinities, by Goethe (1978)
Tales of Hoffmann, by E. T. A. Hoffmann (1982)
Aphorisms, by Georg Christoph Lichtenberg (1990) ; (Reprinted as The Waste Books 2000)

As composed or published by Friedrich Nietzsche in chronological order:
The Untimely Meditations (1983)
Human, All-Too-Human: A Book for Free Spirits (1986)
Daybreak (1982)
Thus Spoke Zarathustra: A Book for Everyone and No One (1961).
Beyond Good and Evil: Prelude to a Philosophy of the Future (1973)
On the Genealogy of Morals (with Walter Kaufmann) (1967)
Twilight of the Idols / The Antichrist (1968)
Ecce Homo: How One Becomes What One Is (1986)
The Will to Power (with Walter Kaufmann) (1967)
Dithyrambs of Dionysus (2001)

References

External links

Obituary in The Guardian

English translators
English biographers
English atheists
1930 births
2001 deaths
Writers from London
People from Streatham
20th-century biographers
20th-century British translators
Translators of Johann Wolfgang von Goethe
Translators of Friedrich Nietzsche